Barry J. Nalebuff (born July 11, 1958) is an American businessman, business theorist, and writer. He is a Milton Steinbach Professor of Management at Yale School of Management and author who specializes in business strategy and game theory. His published books include Thinking Strategically and The Art of Strategy. Nalebuff's class on negotiation has over 67,000 active learners through Coursera and has the second-highest net promoter score on the platform.  He has a semi-regular column in Forbes with Ian Ayres called "Why Not?"

Nalebuff also has multiple entrepreneurial ventures. He was a co-founder of Honest Tea and Kombrewcha. He serves on the board of Q Drinks (started by his former student Jordan Silbert), Calicraft Beer, and AGP Glass.

Education
Nalebuff graduated in 1976 from the Belmont Hill School and in 1980 from MIT with degrees in economics and mathematics. He then earned his master's degree and doctorate in economics from Oxford University on a Rhodes Scholarship.

Academic career
Prior to joining the faculty at Yale, Nalebuff was a member of the Junior Society of Fellows at Harvard University and worked as an assistant professor at Princeton University.

Books

References

External links
 Bio of Nalebuff on Yale University's website
 Story of Nalebuff's co-founding Honest Tea on Honest Tea's website
 Co-opetition, with Adam Brandenburger and Barry Nalebuff
 Why Not? How to Use Everyday Ingenuity to Solve Problems Big and Small, with Ian Ayres and Barry Nalebuff
 Forbes: Why Not?
 
 

1958 births
Living people
Alumni of Nuffield College, Oxford
American non-fiction writers
American Rhodes Scholars
Belmont Hill School alumni
Harvard Fellows
Princeton University faculty
Yale School of Management faculty
Yale University faculty